Martin Edwin Green (June 3, 1815 – June 27, 1863) was a Confederate brigadier general in the American Civil War, and a key organizer of the Missouri State Guard in northern Missouri.

Early life

Green was born in Fauquier County, Virginia.  In 1836 he and his young bride moved to Lewis County, Missouri where he and his brothers established a sawmill.  He became a prominent Democrat and Judge of the Lewis County Court.  His brother was Missouri's Democratic Party United States Senator James S. Green.

Civil War

At the outbreak of the war in 1861, Green was a leading secessionist in Northeast Missouri.  Following a July 4 riot at Canton, Missouri Judge Green summoned pro-Southern citizens to a training camp on the Fabius River under the auspices of the district's Missouri State Guard.  He formed this mass into a cavalry regiment and Joseph C. Porter served as the lieutenant colonel.

Green went on the offensive in Northeast Missouri attempting to scatter David Moore's Union Home Guard regiment.  Green's much larger force included some artillery and struck Moore at Athens.  Green's raw recruits were repulsed and retreated from the field.

Green and his regiment participated in the successful attack on Lexington in September 1861 and at the defeat at Pea Ridge (or Elkhorn Tavern), March 1862.  They also were present at the defeats at Iuka and Corinth.

Promotion and death
Green was commissioned a Confederate States brigadier general from July 21, 1862.  He commanded a brigade of Bowen's Division in the Siege of Vicksburg. He was slightly wounded on June 25, 1863. On June 27, 1863, during the siege, he was warned to keep his head down while inspecting the defenses. "A bullet has not yet been molded that will kill me", he answered. Those were his last words. Moments later he was shot in the head and killed by a Union sharpshooter. According to the NPS Confederate Soldier listing at Vicksburg, a footnote remarks he was interred at the George Marshall Lot; reportedly he is buried in Grave # 542 Cedar Hill Cemetery (Vicksburg, Mississippi).

See also

List of American Civil War generals (Confederate)

References

 Anders, Leslie; 'Farthest North' The Historian and the Battle of Athens., Missouri Historical Review, January 1975.
 Eicher, John H., and David J. Eicher, Civil War High Commands. Stanford: Stanford University Press, 2001. .
 Sifakis, Stewart. Who Was Who in the Civil War. New York: Facts On File, 1988. .
 Warner, Ezra J. Generals in Gray: Lives of the Confederate Commanders. Baton Rouge: Louisiana State University Press, 1959. .

External links
http://www.nps.gov/vick/historyculture/confederate-interments-g.htm NPS Listing

People from Fauquier County, Virginia
People of Missouri in the American Civil War
Confederate States Army brigadier generals
Confederate States of America military personnel killed in the American Civil War
Missouri State Guard
1815 births
1863 deaths